The Malta national football team represents the country of Malta in international association football and is controlled by the Malta Football Association (MFA), the local governing body of football which was founded in 1900. The MFA became a member of the Fédération Internationale de Football Association (FIFA) in 1959 and a year later joined the Union of European Football Associations (UEFA). Prior to that, on 24 February 1957, the team played its first official international match at the Empire Stadium against Austria, suffering a 3–2 defeat. The first goal was scored by Tony Cauchi.

As of September 2021, Malta has played 418 international fixtures, winning 54, drawing 70 and losing 294. The team's most frequent opponent has been Iceland, meeting the side 15 times, winning 3, drawing 1 and losing 11. In global and continental competitions, Malta has competed in qualification groups for both the UEFA European Championship, since 1962, and the FIFA World Cup, since 1974, but has failed to qualify for any tournament finals.

Michael Mifsud is Malta's most capped player, accumulating 143 appearances as of November 2020. He made his debut on 10 February 2000 in a 1–0 defeat against Albania. He broke the record previously held by David Carabott of 122 appearances on 15 November 2016 against Iceland. Mifsud is also Malta's leading goalscorer with 42 goals as of November 2020. He surpassed Carmel Busuttil's record of 23 goals on 3 March 2010.

Since 1957, more than 300 players have made at least one international appearance for the team. Of these, seven have achieved more than 100 caps. Carmel Busuttil was the first to reach this milestone on 6 February 2000 against Azerbaijan.

Key

Players

References and notes

Notes

References

Additional references

External links 

 All-time appearances list

 
Association football player non-biographical articles